The 1787 Vermont Republic gubernatorial election took place throughout September, and resulted in the re-election of Thomas Chittenden to a one-year term.

The Vermont General Assembly met in Newbury on October 11. The Vermont House of Representatives appointed a committee to examine the votes of the freemen of Vermont for governor, lieutenant governor, treasurer, and members of the governor's council. In the race for governor, Thomas Chittenden was re-elected to his tenth one-year term.

In the election for lieutenant governor Joseph Marsh, who had served a partial term beginning in February, was elected to a full one-year term. The freemen re-elected Samuel Mattocks as treasurer, his second one-year term. The names of candidates and balloting totals were not recorded. One Vermont newspaper reported that Chittenden had been re-elected "by a great majority of the freemen."

Results

References

Vermont gubernatorial elections
1787 in Vermont
1787 elections in North America